Charleville Airport  is an airport located  southwest of Charleville, a town in the state of Queensland in Australia.

The Royal Flying Doctor Service has one of its nine Queensland bases at Charleville Airport.

Airlines and destinations

Regular services operated under contract to the Government of Queensland. Services operated by Skytrans were taken over by Regional Express Airlines from 1 January 2015.

History
During World War II, the United States Army Air Forces 63d Bombardment Squadron, assigned to the Fifth Air Force 43d Bombardment Group, flew B-17 Flying Fortresses from the airfield between 15 June and 3 August 1942.

Other USAAF units assigned to Charleville were the 8th and 480th Service Squadron of the 45th Service Group.

Charleville was also the western terminus of the Air Transport Command Pacific Wing (later Division).

The Royal Australian Air Force (RAAF) had a unit at Charleville. No 15 Operational Base Unit provided support services for transiting aircraft, such as refuelling or minor maintenance.

See also
 United States Army Air Forces in Australia (World War II)
 List of airports in Queensland

References

External links
 

Airports in Queensland
Airfields of the United States Army Air Forces Air Transport Command in the South West Pacific Theater
Airfields of the United States Army Air Forces in Australia
South West Queensland
Queensland in World War II